The matrix-core theory of thalamus, first proposed by Ted Jones, states that neurons in the thalamus belong to either a calbindin-immunopositive matrix of diffusely and widely projecting neurons, or to a parvalbumin-immunopositive core of precisely projecting neurons.  Unfortunately only one nucleus is simply immunoreactive to just one of three calcium binding proteins, and that is the centromedial nuclei which stains for parvalbumin. A given region usually stains for two of the three proteins—parvalbumin, calbindin, and calretinin The neurons comprising the core are believed to be involved in propagation of 'driving' information, whereas neurons comprising the matrix are believed to play a more modulatory role.

Overall, the calcium-binding proteins show a complementary staining pattern in the human thalamus. In general terms, the highest density of parvalbumin stain is in the nuclei of the ventral nuclear group (i.e. in the ventral anterior, ventral lateral and ventral posterior nuclei) and in the medial and lateral geniculate nuclear groups. Moderate amounts of parvalbumin staining are also present in regions of the medio-dorsal nucleus (MD). By contrast, calbindin and calretinin immunoreactivity show a similar distribution of dense staining in the rostral intralaminar nuclear group and in the patchy regions of the MD thalamus which appears to complement the pattern of parvalbumin staining. However, calbindin and calretinin also show low levels of staining in the ventral nuclear group and in the medial and lateral geniculate bodies which overlaps with the intense parvalbumin staining in these regions. These results show that the calcium-binding proteins are heterogeneously distributed in a complementary fashion within the nuclei of the thalamus. The primate thalamus consists of a matrix of calbindin immunoreactive cells and a superimposed core of parvalbumin immunoreactive cells which may have differential patterns of cortical projections.

References

Thalamus